Bârgăuani is a commune in Neamț County, Western Moldavia, Romania. It is composed of thirteen villages: Bahna Mare, Baratca (Barátka), Bălănești, Bârgăuani, Breaza (Bráza), Certieni, Chilia, Dârloaia, Ghelăiești, Hârtop, Homiceni, Talpa (Talpa) and Vlădiceni.

At the 2002 census, 100% of inhabitants were ethnic Romanians. 62.8% were Romanian Orthodox and 36.9% Roman Catholic.

References

Communes in Neamț County
Localities in Western Moldavia